Nine Maidens may refer to:

 Boskednan stone circle, traditionally known as the Nine Maidens
 Nine Maidens stone circle, near Belstone on Dartmoor
 Nine Maidens stone row, near St Columb Major in Cornwall
 Nine Maidens Downs, near Four Lanes in Cornwall
 The Nine Maidens, an album by John Renbourn
 Nine maidens (mythology), a theme in mythology